Graham Cormack is a Scottish male curler.

At the national level, he is a 2002 Scottish men's champion curler.

Since 2020 he has been a Board Member of British Curling.

Teams

References

External links

Living people
Scottish male curlers
Scottish curling champions
Year of birth missing (living people)
Place of birth missing (living people)